Orhan Vojić (born 20 January 1997) is an Austrian football player of Bosnian descent. He plays for SK Vorwärts Steyr in the Austrian Football Second League.

Club career
He made his Austrian Football First League debut for LASK Linz on 29 May 2015 in a game against Floridsdorfer AC.

In February 2019 Vojić signed for Shamrock Rovers F.C. of the League of Ireland after impressing on trial for the club in pre-season.

References

External links
 

1997 births
Footballers from Linz
Austrian people of Bosnia and Herzegovina descent
Living people
Austrian footballers
FC Juniors OÖ players
LASK players
Shamrock Rovers F.C. players
2. Liga (Austria) players
League of Ireland players
Regionalliga players
Austrian expatriate footballers
Expatriate footballers in Germany
Association football forwards